

History
Subiaco-Floreat Cricket Club is one of the sixteen cricket clubs playing in the Western Australian Grade Cricket competition.  It was founded in 1977 as a result of the amalgamation of Subiaco Cricket Club and Floreat Park Cricket Club.

The Subiaco Club was formed in 1907 when it was admitted to the Western Australian Cricket Association.  Notable former players included former Prime Minister of Australia Bob Hawke, John Rutherford and Des Hoare.

Floreat Park Cricket Club was founded in 1956 and played in the WACA 2nd Grade.  Notable former players from there included Australian captain Kim Hughes and Terry Alderman.

Home Ground
The club's main ground is Floreat Oval, on the corner of Oceanic Drive and Ulster Road, Floreat.

Club Achievements

Notable players
John Rutherford
Kim Hughes
Terry Alderman
Graeme Porter
Nathan Coulter-Nile
Nicole Bolton
Jason Behrendorff
Marcus Stoinis
Cameron Green

References

Cricket clubs established in 1977
Western Australian Grade Cricket clubs
1977 establishments in Australia
Sporting clubs in Perth, Western Australia